Carl Veidahl (6 March 1879 – 27 July 1974) was a Norwegian sport shooter. He was born in Våler in Østfold, and his club was Oslo Østre Skytterlag. He competed in military rifle at the 1912 Summer Olympics in Stockholm.

References

1879 births
1974 deaths
People from Våler, Østfold
Shooters at the 1912 Summer Olympics
Olympic shooters of Norway
Norwegian male sport shooters
Sportspeople from Viken (county)
20th-century Norwegian people